Otto Theodor Krogh (22 April 1878 – 3 March 1952) was a Norwegian rower. He was born in Hamar, and competed for Christiania Roklub. He competed in coxed eight at the 1912 Summer Olympics in Stockholm.

References

External links

1878 births
1952 deaths
Sportspeople from Hamar
Norwegian male rowers
Rowers at the 1908 Summer Olympics
Rowers at the 1912 Summer Olympics
Olympic rowers of Norway